Silvia Vanessa Hernández Sánchez (born November 21, 1976) is a Costa Rican economist and politician who has been President of the country's Legislative Assembly since 1 May 2021.

Early life and education
Hernández was born in San José on November 21, 1976, the oldest of five children and only daughter of Freddy Hernández and María de los Ángeles Sánchez. Her paternal grandfather was a diplomat and deputy in the government of Daniel Oduber.

Hernández attended public school in Turrialba and Siquirres, before graduating from Bryant High School in Arkansas in 1996 through an exchange program. She studied at Universidad Regiomontana in Monterrey, Mexico, before completing a Bachelor of Economics at the Latin University of Costa Rica.  While studying, she worked in a call center, and in 2002, she was hit by a car on her way home, breaking both legs and requiring spinal surgery. After spending six months in rehabilitation, she received a scholarship to study in The Netherlands. She has a Masters in Development Economics from Erasmus University and a Masters in International Markets from the University of Salamanca.

Career
Hernández is an economist, and has taught at Lead University in San José. From 2006 to 2007, she was an economic advisor to Vice President Kevin Casas Zamora.

Hernández was elected to the Legislative Assembly as a PLN deputy from San José. She worked as Deputy Minister of National Planning and Economic Policy in the government of Laura Chinchilla from 2012 to 2014. She has been president of the Tax Affair Commission, as well as a member of the Science, Technology and Education and OECD Special Commissions. In April 2019, she was elected chair of the National Liberation Party.

Hernández has published opinion pieces and analysis in La Republica, El Financiero and Dos Magazine.

Hernández was elected President of the Legislative Assembly on May 1, 2021 with 42 votes, and is the fourth woman to hold the position.

Personal life
Hernández married Rigoberto Zúñiga, a real estate developer, in 2009 and lives in Cartago. They have one daughter. She is Catholic.

References

Living people
1976 births
People from San José, Costa Rica
Erasmus University Rotterdam alumni
University of Salamanca alumni
National Liberation Party (Costa Rica) politicians
21st-century Costa Rican women politicians
Presidents of the Legislative Assembly of Costa Rica
Women legislative speakers
Costa Rican Roman Catholics
Latin University of Costa Rica alumni
21st-century Costa Rican politicians